Stephanie of Milly (born ) was the lady of Oultrejordain in 1169–1197 and an influential figure in the Kingdom of Jerusalem. She was also known as Stephanie de Milly, Etienette de Milly, and Etiennette de Milly. She married three times; firstly to Humphrey III of Toron, secondly to Miles of Plancy; her third and last husband was Raynald of Chatillon.

Family and early life

She was the younger daughter of Philip of Milly, lord of Nablus, and Isabella of Oultrejordain, who herself was the daughter and heiress of Maurice of Montreal, lord of Oultrejordain. Through her various marriages, several of her husbands became lords of Oultrejordain. Her first marriage, in 1163, was to Humphrey III of Toron, who died in 1173. This marriage produced two children: a son, Humphrey (the future Humphrey IV of Toron), and a daughter, Isabella, who married Ruben III of Armenia. Her second husband was Miles of Plancy, lord of Oultrejordain, who was assassinated in 1174.

Third marriage
In 1177, she married Raynald of Châtillon, the former Prince of Antioch, who had recently been released from captivity in Aleppo. Through Stephanie, Raynald succeeded as lord jure uxoris of the lordship of Oultrejordain, and used his new position to harass Muslim caravan and pilgrimage routes; in 1183 he even threatened to attack Mecca itself. In 1180, Baldwin IV of Jerusalem had betrothed his eight-year-old  half-sister Isabella to Stephanie's son Humphrey. The marriage took place in the castle of Kerak in 1183. The ceremonies were interrupted by the arrival of Saladin, who besieged the place in response to Raynald's threats against Mecca. According to the chronicle of Ernoul, Stephanie sent messengers to Saladin, reminding him of the friendship they shared when he had been a prisoner in Kerak many years before; this is likely a fiction or some mis-remembered event, as Saladin is not otherwise known to have ever been held hostage at Kerak. Saladin did not lift the siege but agreed not to target Humphrey and Isabella's wedding chamber. The siege was soon raised by King Baldwin. The Old French Continuation of William of Tyre claimed that Stephanie hated Isabella's mother Maria Comnena, and prevented her having any contact with her daughter. This was probably for political reasons: Baldwin had arranged the marriage to remove the little girl from the influence of her stepfather's family, the Ibelins.

Capture of Humphrey
Raynald continued to harass the caravan and pilgrimage routes, leading to the invasion of the kingdom by Saladin in 1187. Raynald was killed at the ensuing Battle of Hattin, at which Humphrey IV was captured. Saladin agreed to return Humphrey to Stephanie in exchange for Kerak and Montreal; the castles refused to surrender, however, and Stephanie dutifully sent her son back to captivity under Saladin. Saladin took pity on her and released him. Her own principality of Oultrejordain and its castles were lost to Saladin within a few years of Hattin, and, located so far from the Mediterranean coast where the remaining crusader strongholds were located, remained in Muslim hands.

As her son Humphrey had apparently died before her, Stephanie's heiress (as well as the heiress of Toron) was her daughter, Isabella.

References

Bibliography

 L. de Mas-Latrie, Chronique d'Ernoul et de Bernard le Trésorier, (in French) Paris, Société de l'histoire de France, 1871.
 William of Tyre, Historia Rerum In Partibus Transmarinis Gestarum (A History of Deeds Done Beyond the Sea), (in English) translated by E. A. Babock and A. C. Krey, Columbia University Press, 1943.
 William of Tyre, Chronique Willelmi Tyrensis Archiepiscopi Chronicon, (in French) edition by R.B.C. Huygens; identification of historical sources and determination of dates fixed by H. E. Mayer and G. Rosch, Turnholti: Brepol, 1986. 2 v. (1170 p. compless.)

External links

1190s deaths
Women of the Crusader states
Year of birth uncertain
Lords of Oultrejordain
12th-century women rulers